Luena Airport  is an airport serving Luena, the capital of the Moxico Province in Angola.

The Luena VOR-DME (Ident: VUE) and the Luena non-directional beacon (Ident: UE) are on the field.

Airlines and destinations

Facilities

The airport has a small and modern terminal building built to replace and older terminal. The control tower is now located next the terminal (old tower was atop of the old terminal building. Hangars and other airport buildings are located next to the main terminal building.

See also
 List of airports in Angola
 Transport in Angola

References

External links
OpenStreetMap - Luena
OurAirports - Luena
 
 

Airports in Angola
Moxico Province